Miss International 1974, the 14th Miss International pageant, was held on October 9, 1974 at the Nippon Budokan Hall in Tokyo, Japan. 45 contestants competed for the title. Brucene Smith from United States, representing American Beauty, was crowned Miss International 1974 by the outgoing titleholder, Tuula Bjorkling from Finland.

Results

Placements

Contestants

  - Nilda Maria Yamaguchi
  - Monique Francisca Daams
  - Margit Schwarzer
  - Marie-Rose Pieters
  - Dilian Nela Martínez
  - Janeta Eleomara Hoeveler
  - Joanna Margaret Booth
  - Sandra Margaret Emily Campbell
  - Maria del Carmen Bono
  - Beatriz del Carmen Cajiao Velasco
  - Ilse Marie Von Herold
  - Lone Andersen
  - Johanna Raunio
  - Josiane Bouffeni
  - Martina Maria Zanft
  - Anny Tatsopoulou
  - Roseann Janice Waller
  - Ann Tomoko Yoshioka
  - Nanna Beetstra
  - Rosario Elena Carvajal
  - Thorunn Stefansdóttir
  - Leslie Jean Hartnett
  - Lydia Arlini Wahab
  - Yvonne Costelloe
  - Feliciana Chantal Del Spirito
  - Hideko Shigekawa
  - Kang Young-sook
  - Carmen Marcolini
  - Amy Theresa Sibert
  - Alicia Elena Cardona Ruiz
  - June St. Clair Buchanan
  - Maria Amanda Rivas Argüello
  - Erlynne Reyes Bernardez
  - Irene Mendes Teixeira
  - Valerie Oh Choon Lian
  - Consuelo "Chelo" Martín López
  - Dayangani Priyanthi Nanayakkara
  - Monica Söderqvist
  - Astrid Maria Angst
  - Micheline Mira Vehiatua
  - Uvadee Sirirachata
  - Sevsin Canturk
  - Mirta Grazilla Rodríguez
  - Brucene Smith
  - Marisela Carderera Marturet

Notes

Withdrawals

Returns 

Last Competed in 1973
  
 

Last Competed in 1971

Awards
  - Miss Congeniality (Alicia Cordona Ruiz)
  - Miss Photogenic (Monique Daams)
  - Best National Costume (Nanna Beestra)

External links
 Pageantopolis - Miss International 1974

1974
1974 beauty pageants
Beauty pageants in Japan
1974 in Tokyo